145 (one hundred [and] forty-five) is the natural number following 144 and preceding 146.

In mathematics 
 Although composite, 145 is a Fermat pseudoprime to sixteen bases with b < 145. In four of those bases, it is a strong pseudoprime: 1, 12, 17, and 144.
 Given 145, the Mertens function returns 0.
 145 is a pentagonal number and a centered square number.
 . 145 is the fourth number that is the sum of two different pairs of squares. Also, 145 is the result of 34 + 43, making it a Leyland number.
 , making it a factorion. The only other numbers that have the property that they are the sum of the factorials of their digits are 1, 2 and 40585.
 , making 145 the smallest number that can be written as the sum of a perfect square and a factorial in more than 2 distinct ways. The next number with this property is 46249.

In the military
  was a United States Navy  during World War II
  was a United States Navy  during World War II
  was a United States Navy  during World War II
  was a United States Navy  during World War II
  was a United States Navy  during World War II
  was a United States Navy  following World War II

In sports
 The Grand Union Canal Race is a 145-mile ultramarathon from Birmingham to London along the Grand Union Canal

In transportation
 Eurocopter EC 145 is a twin-engine light utility helicopter
 The Delahaye 145 Sports Car from 1938
 The Alfa Romeo 145 car produced between 1994 and 2001
 Volvo 145 Express station wagon
 ERJ 145 regional jets produced by Embraer
 Golden Gate Transit Bus Route 145
 London Bus Route 145

In other fields
145 is also:
 The year AD 145 or 145 BC
 145 AH is a year in the Islamic calendar that corresponds to 762 – 763 CE
 145 Adeona is a large main belt asteroid
 Psalm 145
 Sonnet 145
 Apple Computer laptops, such as the PowerBook 145 and PowerBook 145B
 Puff Daddy song “Picture it” includes the lyrics “in something foreign soarin’ 145”
 Tsuu T'ina Nation 145 Indian reserve in Alberta, Canada
 145 mg medicine tablets, as with Tricor
 "One Four Five" is a song by The Cat Empire

See also
 List of highways numbered 145
 United Nations Security Council Resolution 145
 United States Supreme Court cases, Volume 145

References 
 Wells, D. The Penguin Dictionary of Curious and Interesting Numbers London: Penguin Group. (1987): 140

External links

 The Natural Number 145
 

Integers